List of rivers in Amapá (Brazilian State).

The list is arranged by drainage basin from north to south, with respective tributaries indented under each larger stream's name and ordered from downstream to upstream. All rivers in Amapá drain to the Atlantic Ocean.

By Drainage Basin 

 Oiapoque River
 Uaçá River
 Caripi River
 Urucaua River
 Cricou River
 Anotaié River
 Marupi River
 Iaué River
 Mutura River 
 Tangararé River
 Kariniutu River
 Cassiporé River
 Arapari River
 Cunani River
 Calçoene River
 Amapá Grande River
 Flechal River
 Macari River
 Tartarugalzinho River
 Tartarugal Grande River
 Araguari River
 Aporema River
 Amapari River
 Cupixi River
 Tacunapi River
 Falsino River
 Santo António River
 Mutum River
 Mururé River
 Tajauí River
 Amazon River (Canal do Norte)
 Guarijuba River
 Jupati River
 Macacoari River
 Pedreira River
 Matapi River
 Maruanum River
 Vila Nova River
 Camaipi River do Vila Nova River
 Piaçaca River
 Preto River
 Maracá-Pucu River
 Camaipi River do Maracá River
 Maracá River
 Cajari River
 São Luis River
 Jari River
 Iratapuru River
 Iratapina River
 Noucouru River
 Mapiri River
 Inipaco River
 Cuc River
 Culari River
 Curapi River
 Ximim-Ximim River
 Mapaoni River

Alphabetically 

 Amapá Grande River
 Amapari River
 Amazon River (Canal do Norte)
 Anotaié River
 Aporema River
 Araguari River
 Arapari River
 Cajari River
 Calçoene River
 Camaipi River do Maracá River
 Camaipi River do Vila Nova River
 Caripi River
 Cassiporé River
 Cricou River
 Cuc River
 Culari River
 Cunani River
 Cupixi River
 Curapi River
 Falsino River
 Flechal River
 Guarijuba River
 Iaué River
 Inipaco River
 Iratapina River
 Iratapuru River
 Jari River
 Jupati River
 Kariniutu River
 Macacoari River
 Macari River
 Mapaoni River
 Mapiri River
 Maracá River
 Maracá-Pucu River
 Maruanum River
 Marupi River
 Matapi River
 Mururé River
 Mutum River
 Mutura River 
 Noucouru River
 Oiapoque River
 Pedreira River
 Piaçaca River
 Preto River
 Santo António River
 São Luis River
 Tacunapi River
 Tajauí River
 Tangararé River
 Tartarugal Grande River
 Tartarugalzinho River
 Uaçá River
 Urucaua River
 Vila Nova River
 Ximim-Ximim River

References
 Map from Ministry of Transport

 
Amapa